IFO or Ifo may refer to:
Places
 Ifo,  a local government area in Ogun State, Nigeria
 Ivano-Frankivsk International Airport in Ivano-Frankivsk, Ukraine, their IATA airport code
 Ifo Camp, UNHCR refugee camp in Kenya
 Ifo Island, Antarctica
Things
 Identified flying object, as opposed to unidentified flying object (UFO)
 Interferometer, an instrument that superimposes waves to cause interference
Other
 IFO, a file type used on DVD-Video
 Ifo Ekpre-Olomu (born 1993), American football player
 The Ifo Institut für Wirtschaftsforschung (Ifo Institute for Economic Research) in Munich, Germany
 Ifo language, found in Vanuatu
 Battle of Ifo, battle in the 2012 Malian Civil War